Think C (stylized as THINK C; formerly Lightspeed C) is an extension of the C programming language for the classic Mac OS developed by Think Technologies, released first in mid-1986. THINK was founded by Andrew Singer, Frank Sinton & Mel Conway.  The firm was later acquired by Symantec Corporation and the product continued to be developed by the original author, Michael Kahl. Versions 3 and later were essentially a subset of C++ and supported basic object-oriented programming (OOP) concepts such as single inheritance, and extensions to the C standard that conformed more closely to the needs of Mac OS programming. After version 6, the OOP facilities were expanded to a full C++ implementation, and the product was rebranded Symantec C++ starting version 7, then under development by different authors. The long-awaited version 8 brought support for compiling to PowerPC.

Think C, and later Symantec C++, featured a class library and framework for Mac programming called the Think Class Library (TCL), which was used extensively for Macintosh application development.

The Lightspeed and Think C integrated development environment (IDE) influenced other such environments, though considered not as advanced as that belonging to Think Pascal, its sister language product. It was considered the standard environment when Macintosh Programmer's Workshop (MPW) was considered an overpriced niche product, and most Macintosh products were developed in it for many years. This changed with transition of the Mac from the Motorola 68000 (68K) to the PowerPC central processing unit (CPU). Symantec was roughly a year late in delivering a version for PowerPC, and was widely seen as having fallen behind, and competitor Metrowerks' product CodeWarrior took control of the market.

Despite the decline in popularity of their IDE, Symantec was eventually chosen by Apple to provide next-generation C/C++ compilers for MPW in the form of Sc/Scpp for 68K alongside MrC/MrCpp for PowerPC. These remained Apple's standard compilers until the arrival of Mac OS X replaced them with the GNU Compiler Collection (GCC). Symantec subsequently exited the developer tool business.

Reception
Bruce F. Webster of BYTE named Lightspeed C product of the month for September 1986. While criticizing the documentation as its "single greatest weakness", Webster stated that Lightspeed C would be the choice if he had to select one compiler for the Macintosh. BYTE in 1989 listed Lightspeed C as among the "Distinction" winners of the Byte Awards, stating that it "wins our respect because of its powerful features and low price".

THINK C 5.0 obtained in 4 (out 5) rating in July 1992 issue of Macworld, praising a fast compilation and an outstanding development environment, despite an insufficient documentation.

Symantec C++ 8.0 obtained a 3 (out 5) rating in July 1995 issue of Macworld, comparing favourably the speed of its PowerPC compiled code with that of CodeWarrior at the time, but noting how delayed the product has been and its heavy requirement on resources.

References

1986 software
Integrated development environments
Macintosh-only software
Classic Mac OS text editors
Gen Digital software
C (programming language) compilers
C++ compilers
Classic Mac OS programming tools